Roger Bourland (born December 13, 1952) is an American composer, publisher, blogger, and Professor-Emeritus of Music at the UCLA Herb Alpert School of Music.

Biography 
Born in Evanston, Illinois, Bourland received a Bachelor of Music in Music Theory and Composition (1976) from the University of Wisconsin, Madison, studying with Leslie Thimmig and Randall Snyder; a Master of Music in Music Composition (1978) from the New England Conservatory of Music, studying with William Thomas McKinley and Donald Martino; and a Master of Arts and Ph.D. in Music Composition from Harvard University, studying with Randall Thompson, Earl Kim and Leon Kirchner.

Bourland studied at Tanglewood with Gunther Schuller and was awarded the Koussevitzky Prize in Composition (1978). Other awards include the John Knowles Paine Fellowship (Harvard), two ASCAP Grants to Young Composers, numerous Meet the Composers grants, and was a co-founder of the Boston-based consortium "Composers in Red Sneakers." Bourland has composed over one hundred fifty works for all media: film, solo, instrumental, chamber, vocal and choral music, electro-acoustic music, and music for orchestra, wind ensemble, and other large ensembles.

From 1983 to 2013, Bourland taught composition, music theory, analysis, orchestration, electro-acoustic composition, and other classes and seminars in the UCLA Herb Alpert School of Music. He was awarded the UCLA Distinguished Teaching Award for 2005-6, and served as Chair of the UCLA Herb Alpert School of Music, Department of Music from 2007-2011. Professor Bourland retired from UCLA in 2013 and moved to Northern California to devote his time to composition.

Selected compositions

OPERA 

Homer in Cyberspace (2009) Book and lyrics by Mel Shapiro (music theater)

Cantatas 
The Crocodile's Christmas Ball and other odd tales (2002) for chorus, soloists and wind ensemble; lyrics by William MacDuff
Rosarium (1999) for soloists, chorus and orchestra; libretto by William MacDuff
Flashpoint/Stonewall (1994) for chorus, soloists, four synthesizers, bass and drums; libretto by John Hall
Letters to the Future (1993) for chorus, soloists, three synthesizers, bass and drums; poems by Francisco X. Alarcón, May Swenson, Adrienne Rich, Allen Ginsberg, James Merrill, J. D. McClatchy and Thom Gunn
Hidden Legacies (1992) for chorus, soloists, four synthesizers, bass and drums; libretto by John Hall

Orchestra, Chamber orchestra, Wind ensemble 
El Ruisenor Mexicano (2016) for orchestra
Poem (2006) for piano and orchestra
The Night Train (2004) for marimba, tom-toms, violin, viola, violoncello, double bass, flute and alto flute, harp, and strings
Trauermusik (2003) for wind ensemble (By W.A Mozart, orchestrated by Roger Bourland)
Ozma (1996) for orchestra; orchestration for wind ensemble (2003)
Mirabell Jam (1992) for orchestra
Rivers in the Sky (1988) for wind ensemble
Scenes from Gauguin (1987) for orchestra
Broken Arrows (1986) for EVI and EWI instruments designed by Nyle Steiner (EVI), four Yamaha DX7s, and jazz ensemble
Serenade No.1: Far in the Night (1983) for soprano saxophone, bassoon, harp, and strings
Cantilena (1983) for string orchestra
Scenes from Redon (1982) for orchestra
Sweet Alchemy (1980) for orchestra
Clarinet Rhapsody (1979) for clarinet and orchestra
Jackson Pollock in Memoriam (1978) for orchestra

Choral music 
Healy Madrigals (2009) for SSAA; poems by Eloise Klein Healy
Alarcón Madrigals, Book 3 (2006) for SSAA; poems by Francisco X. Alarcón
A More Perfect Union (2005) for TTBB and piano; lyrics by Philip Littell
Alarcón Madrigals, Book 2 (2002) for SSAA; poems by Francisco X. Alarcón
Keeping the Ocean Free (2000) for SATB and piano; lyrics by William MacDuff
Spiritual Gifts (2000) for SATB and organ; lyrics by Roger Bourland
Fa La La (Blah, Blah, Blah) (1998) for TTBB, SATB, or SSAA and piano; lyrics by William MacDuff
Look Behind our Song (1996) for TTBB, and piano; lyrics by John Hall
The Acts of Love (1995) for men's chorus; poem by Michael J. Lafferty
Alarcón Madrigals, Book 1 (1993) for SSAA or SATB; poems by Francisco X. Alarcón
All there is is love (1993) for TTBB; text by Paul Monette
The Son of God Was Singing (1987) for SATB and organ or piano; lyrics by Roger Bourland
Christmas Introit (1987) for SATB and organ or piano; lyrics by Roger Bourland
Dickinson Madrigals, Book 3 (1985) for TTBB; poems by Emily Dickinson
Psalm 47, a setting of Psalm 47 (1983) for SATB
His Spirit Lives (1983) for SATB; poem by Amos Niven Wilder
Antiphon (1983) for SATB; poem by George Herbert
Dickinson Madrigals, Book 2 (1983) for SSAA; poems by Emily Dickinson
Dickinson Madrigals, Book 1 (1980) for SSAA; poems by Emily Dickinson
Twelve New Hymns (1980) for SATB; lyrics by Gary Bachlund
Garden Abstract (1976) for SSSAAA (2 sopranos, 2 mezzo-sopranos, 2 altos); poem by Hart Crane
Three Clouds (1975) for mixed chorus; lyrics by Roger Bourland
(For large-scale choral works, see  Cantatas below)

Chamber music 
Four Poets (2005) for string quartet
Emily (2005) for string quartet, bass, and banjo
Four Painters (2001)  for violin, viola, cello, piano
Stories We Tell (1998) for four cellos
American Baroque (1992) for violin, cello, piano
Three Arias (1989) for viola or cello and piano
Recent Dreams (1989) for horn, violin, piano
Aesop, the Peasant (1987) for speaker, flute, clarinet, violin, cello, piano; texts by V.A. Kolve
Serenade No.2: Paintings (1986) for violin, cello, piano, flute, clarinet in Bb
Saxophone Quintet (1984) for soprano saxophone, string quartet
Montana Suite (1984) for string quartet
Dances from the Sacred Harp (1983) for flute, alto fl. in G, piccolo, clarinet in Bb, piano, violin, viola, cello, percussion
Nostos (1982) for flute, alto flute, clarinet, bass clarinet, soprano saxophone, alto saxophone
Stone Quartet (1982) for soprano sax, viola, cello, and piano
Cantilena (1981) for flute, soprano sax, or clarinet in Bb and organ
Three Dark Paintings (1981) for strings, soprano sax, viola and piano
The Death of Narcissus (1980) for piano, strings, and wind ensemble
Beowulf Trio (1979) for flute, violin, cello
Personae (1978) for cello, bass (in solo tuning)
Seven Pollock Paintings (1978) for flute, clarinet, soprano saxophone, bass clarinet, tam tam, violin, viola, cello, bass

Songs

Keyboard music

Composer for Motion Pictures and TV

References

External links
Official website

1952 births
20th-century classical composers
21st-century classical composers
American male bloggers
American bloggers
American male classical composers
Harvard Graduate School of Arts and Sciences alumni
New England Conservatory alumni
American LGBT musicians
LGBT classical composers
Living people
UCLA Herb Alpert School of Music faculty
21st-century American composers
20th-century American composers
20th-century American male musicians
21st-century American male musicians